Alyssa Cruz Aguero (born April 16, 1988) is a Guamanian beauty pageant titleholder who was crowned Miss Guam 2012 and represented her country in the 2012 Miss Universe pageant.

Career

Miss Guam 2012
On August 31, 2012, Cruz Aguero won the 2012 Miss Universe Guam title at the Hyatt Regency in Tumon.

Miss Universe 2012 
On December 19, 2012, Cruz Aguero represented Guam and competed in the 2012 Miss Universe pageant that was held at PH Live at Planet Hollywood Resort & Casino, Las Vegas, Nevada, U.S. Cruz Aguero was not placed in the Top 16.

References

External links
 Official Miss Guam website
 Official Miss Guam Facebook

1988 births
Miss Universe 2012 contestants
Living people
Guamanian beauty pageant winners
People from Barrigada